Kürşat may refer to:

 Kürşat Duymuş (born 1979), Turkish footballer 
 Osman Kürşat Duman (born 1987), Turkish footballer 
 Volkan Kürşat Bekiroğlu (born 1977), Turkish footballer

See also
 Kürşad
 Kürşat (hero)

Turkish masculine given names